Richard Griffin, 3rd Baron Braybrooke (26 September 1783 – 13 March 1858), known as Richard Neville until 1797 and as the Hon. Richard Griffin between 1797 and 1825, was a British Whig politician and literary figure.

Background and education
Born at Stanlake Park at Ruscombe in Berkshire, Braybrooke was the son of Richard Griffin, 2nd Baron Braybrooke, and Catherine, daughter of Prime Minister George Grenville. His father had inherited the barony as well as Audley End from his kinsman, John Whitwell, 4th Baron Howard de Walden and 1st Baron Braybrooke, in 1797. He was educated at Eton and Christ Church, Oxford, also taking a degree as nobleman at Magdalene College, Cambridge. In 1797 he assumed, alongside his father, by Royal licence the surname of Griffin in lieu of his patronymic. He served as a Captain in the Royal Berkshire Militia 1803–4.

Political career
Braybrooke was returned to Parliament for Thirsk in 1805, a seat he held until 1806, and then represented Saltash in 1807, Buckingham between 1807 and 1812 and Berkshire between 1812 and 1825. The latter year he succeeded his father in the barony and took his seat in the House of Lords.

Writings
Braybrooke was the editor of The Diary of Samuel Pepys, published in 1825. He also published The History of Audley End and Saffron Walden (1835) and The Life of Jane, Lady Cornwallis (1842). In 1838 he became a Fellow of the Society of Antiquaries. Between 1853 and 1858 he served as president of the Camden Society.

Family
Lord Braybrooke married Lady Jane, daughter of Charles Cornwallis, 2nd Marquess Cornwallis, in 1819. They had five sons and three daughters. She died in September 1856, aged 57. Lord Braybrooke survived her by two years and died at Audley End in March 1858, aged 74. He was succeeded in the barony by his eldest son, Richard.

References

External links 
 
 
 
 

1783 births
1858 deaths
People educated at Eton College
Alumni of Magdalene College, Cambridge
03
Royal Berkshire Militia officers
Members of the Parliament of the United Kingdom for Berkshire
UK MPs 1802–1806
UK MPs 1807–1812
UK MPs 1812–1818
UK MPs 1818–1820
UK MPs 1820–1826
UK MPs who inherited peerages
People from Waltham St Lawrence
People from Ruscombe
Whig (British political party) MPs for English constituencies
Surtees Society